Redding is an unincorporated community in Lawrence County, Indiana, in the United States.

History
Redding was platted in 1842. The post office Redding once contained was called Sinking Spring. This post office operated from 1837 until 1852.

References

Unincorporated communities in Lawrence County, Indiana
Unincorporated communities in Indiana